The Dini Petty Show was a Canadian daytime television talk show, which aired on stations affiliated with the Baton Broadcasting System from 1989 to 1999. It originated from the BBS flagship station, Toronto's CFTO-TV.

Hosted by Dini Petty, the program mixed lifestyle features and interviews with celebrity guests. Petty, a host and broadcaster based in Toronto, left the CITY-TV talk show CityLine to headline the show in 1989. Directed by Randy Gulliver, the show reflected popular culture in Canada in the 1990s, featuring interviews with celebrities, actors, authors, singers and performers, as well as politicians, policy advocates and local celebrities. The show underwent a re-development in late 1994. In 1999, Dini Petty agreed to only shoot "tops and tails" to introduce repackaged retrospective segments of previous episodes to be aired instead of new material.

Awards 
The show was nominated for several Can Pro and Gemini Awards in 1992, 1997 and 1998.

Notable episodes 
The show received a NATPE (National Association of Television Program Executives) International Iris Award in 1992 for an hour-long interview with comedian Red Skelton. Petty also received a Can-Pro Award in 1997 for a one-hour interview with Sarah, Duchess of York.

Reoccurring guests 
Broadcaster Dan Duran was a frequent co-host on the show throughout the 1990s.

Cancellation 
Petty's contract with CTV ended in 2000, which led to a legal agreement resulting in Petty being awarded the original broadcast tapes to The Dini Petty Show. She donated the tapes to the Clara Thomas Archives & Special Collections at York University in 2010.

References

External links
 
The Dini Petty Show episode recordings preserved at the Clara Thomas Archives & Special Collections, York University Libraries, Toronto.

1989 Canadian television series debuts
1996 Canadian television series endings
CTV Television Network original programming
1980s Canadian television talk shows
1990s Canadian television talk shows